Lamium (dead-nettles) is a genus of about 30 species of flowering plants in the family Lamiaceae, of which it is the type genus. They are all herbaceous plants native to Europe, Asia, and northern Africa, but several have become very successful weeds of crop fields and are now widely naturalised across much of the temperate world.

Description
The genus includes both annual and perennial species; they spread by both seeds and stems rooting as they grow along the ground. They have square stems and coarsely textured pairs of leaves, often with striking patterns or variegation. They produce double-lipped flowers in a wide range of colours.

The common name "dead-nettle" has been derived from the German taube-nessel ("deaf nettle", or "nettle without a kernel"), and refers to the resemblance of Lamium album to the very distantly related stinging nettles, but unlike those, they do not have stinging hairs and so are harmless or apparently "dead".

Several closely related genera were formerly included in Lamium by some botanists, including Galeopsis (hemp-nettles) and Leonurus (motherworts).

Cultivation 
Lamium species are widely cultivated as groundcover, and numerous cultivars have been selected for garden use. They are frost hardy and grow well in most soils. Flower colour determines planting season and light requirement: white- and purple-coloured flowered species are planted in spring and prefer full sun. The yellow-flowered ones are planted in fall (autumn) and prefer shade. They often have invasive habits and need plenty of room.

Ecology

Lamium species are used as food plants by the larvae of some Lepidoptera species including angle shades, setaceous Hebrew character and the Coleophora case-bearers C. ballotella, C. lineolea and C. ochripennella. 
 Species
 Lamium album L. – (white dead-nettle) – widespread across Europe + northern Asia from Spain + Norway to Japan + Kamchatka; naturalized in New Zealand + North America
 Lamium amplexicaule L. – (henbit dead-nettle)       – widespread across Europe and northern Asia from Spain + Norway to Japan + Kamchatka, as well as North Africa, Ethiopia, Azores, Madeira, Canary Islands; naturalized in New Zealand, Hawaii, South America + North America
 Lamium bifidum Cirillo – Mediterranean from Portugal to Romania
 Lamium caucasicum Grossh. – Caucasus (southern European Russia, Armenia, Georgia, Azerbaijan)
 Lamium confertum Fr. – northern Europe from Ireland to northern Russia; naturalized in Greenland + Iceland
 Lamium coutinhoi J.G.García – Portugal
 Lamium demirizii A.P.Khokhr. – Turkey
 Lamium eriocephalum Benth. – Turkey
 Lamium flexuosum Ten. – Spain, France, Italy, Algeria, Morocco, Tunisia 
 Lamium galactophyllum Boiss. & Reut. – Turkey
 Lamium galeobdolon (L.) L. – northern + central Europe and western Asia from Spain + Denmark east to Iran + Western Siberia; naturalized in New Zealand + Madeira
 Lamium garganicum L. – Mediterranean + western Asia from Portugal to Kazakhstan + Saudi Arabia
 Lamium gevorense (Gómez Hern.) Gómez Hern. & A.Pujadas – Spain, Portugal, Corsica
 Lamium glaberrimum (K.Koch) Taliev – Crimea
 Lamium × holsaticum Prahl – central Europe (L. album × L. maculatum)
 Lamium macrodon Boiss. & A.Huet – Turkey, Caucasus, Syria, Iran, Iraq
 Lamium maculatum (L.) L. – (spotted white dead-nettle, purple dragon) – Europe + Middle East from Portugal to Turkey; also Gansu + Xinjiang Provinces of western China
 Lamium moluccellifolium (northern dead-nettle)
 Lamium moschatum Mill. – eastern Mediterranean (Greece, Turkey, Syria, Palestine, Cyprus) 
 Lamium multifidum L. – Turkey, Caucasus
 Lamium orientale (Fisch. & C.A.Mey.) E.H.L.Krause – Turkey, Syria, Palestine
 Lamium orvala L. – Austria, Italy, Hungary, Slovenia
 Lamium purpureum L. (red dead-nettle) – northern + central Europe and western Asia from Spain + Denmark east to Caucasus + Siberia; naturalized in Korea, Taiwan, North America, New Zealand, Argentina, Falkland Islands
 Lamium taiwanense S.S.Ying – Taiwan
 Lamium tomentosum Willd. – Turkey, Caucasus, Iran, Iraq
 Lamium vreemanii A.P.Khokhr. – Turkey

References

 
Lamiaceae genera
Garden plants
Flora of Europe
Flora of Serbia
Flora of Africa